Richard Marfuggi is an American medical professional, author, and expert witness. He is primarily known for his expertise in the field of plastic surgery, and is a board-certified plastic surgeon. He has been featured in publications like Marie Claire, The Advocate, Cosmopolitan, and Men's Health. He has also provided insight on numerous television programs, including The Early Show on CBS. Marfuggi is the first medical doctor to hold a doctorate in medical humanities and is the academic director for the National Student Leadership Conference's Medicine & Health Care Program.

Education
Marfuggi earned his undergraduate degree at the College of the Holy Cross in 1972. After receiving an A.B. Honors degree at Holy Cross, he returned to his home state to study at The University of Vermont College of Medicine where he earned his doctorate in 1976. Marfuggi had his internship & residencies at the University of Pittsburgh School of Medicine, Eastern Virginia Graduate School of Medicine, and the Institute of Reconstructive Plastic Surgery at New York University He would eventually earn a Master's degree in the early 2000s at Drew University and was the first medical doctor to earn a doctorate in medical humanities. The College of the Holy Cross bequeaths annual awards for students and faculty made possible by donations from Marfuggi. The awards are named in honor of Marfuggi's parents, Mary Louise Marfuggi (faculty awards) and Anthony P. Marfuggi (student awards).

Career
Marfuggi opened his plastic surgery practice in 1983 in New Jersey and he is currently affiliated with the Morristown Medical Center. One of his first high-profile patients was Marla Hanson, a model who had been the victim of an assault that left scars on her face. In 1998, Marfuggi wrote Plastic Surgery: What You Need to Know-Before, During, and After, a book that details the benefits, risks, and effects of a wide range of plastic surgery procedures. The book discusses topics like breast augmentation, liposuction, recovery tips, and other plastic surgery concepts. Dr. Marfuggi is a member in good standing of the American Board of Plastic Surgery.

After the release of his book, Marfuggi was asked to contribute to a wide array of magazine articles, books, and television programs. In May 2002, he was featured in a piece on CBS' The Early Show called "Mirror Mirror" reported by Julie Chen. In the piece, Marfuggi discussed the aftermath of plastic surgery mishaps and what people should do in the event that they are unhappy with their results. Marfuggi also became an expert witness, often for cases that involved potentially botched plastic surgeries. In 2010, Marfuggi was sued by fellow plastic surgeon Dr. Robert Cattani who contended that Marfuggi's expert testimony in three separate lawsuits against him was defamation. The court threw out Cattani's suit indicating that Marfuggi was immune to litigation for his testimony and that Marfuggi had also told the truth during that testimony. Cattani and his attorney were fined and sanctioned by the court for filing the case, and Cattani would eventually have his medical license revoked.

Over the course of his career, Marfuggi has been a professor and lecturer at institutions like Centenary College of New Jersey, the Drew University Caspersen School of Graduate Studies, and the National Student Leadership Conference. He is currently a board member for Lighthouse Guild International and is the academic director for the National Student Leadership Conference's Medicine & Health Care Program. He also serves on the New Jersey State Medical Society's Biomedical Ethics Committee and is a supernumerary actor at the Metropolitan Opera.

References

External links
 Official Website

Living people
American plastic surgeons
College of the Holy Cross alumni
University of Vermont alumni
Drew University alumni
Year of birth missing (living people)